The following are the association football events of the year 1880 throughout the world.

Events

Clubs founded in 1880

Belgium
Antwerp F.C.

England
Clevedon Town F.C.
Dorchester Town F.C.
Hednesford Town F.C.
Manchester City F.C.
Preston North End F.C.

Northern Ireland
Moyola Park F.C.

Domestic cups

Births
 8 February – Joe Bache (d. 1960), England international forward in seven matches (1903–1911), scoring four goals.
 29 March – Bobby Templeton (d. 1919), Scotland international forward in eleven matches (1902–1913).
 25 May – Alf Common (d. 1946), England international forward in three matches (1904–1906), scoring two goals; the first player to be transferred for a fee of £1,000.
 11 October – Jimmy McMenemy (d. 1965), Scotland international forward in twelve matches (1905–1920), scoring five goals.
 18 October – Robert Hawkes (d. 1945), England international half-back in five matches (1907–1908).
 28 October – Billy Wedlock (d. 1965), England international half-back in 26 matches (1907–1914), scoring two goals.
 10 December – Andrew Wilson (d. 1945), Scotland international forward in six matches (1907–1914).

References

 
Association football by year